Dolichognatha incanescens is a species of spider in the family Tetragnathidae, found in Sri Lanka, Borneo, New Guinea and Queensland, Australia.

References

Tetragnathidae
Arthropods of New Guinea
Spiders of Asia
Spiders of Australia
Spiders described in 1895